The Tumbes pewee or western tropical pewee (Contopus punensis) is a passerine bird in the family Tyrannidae formerly thought to be conspecific with the tropical pewee (Contopus cinereus). It is endemic to western Ecuador and western Peru.

References

Tumbes pewee
Birds of Ecuador
Birds of Peru
Birds of the Tumbes-Chocó-Magdalena
Tumbes pewee